Blastobasis ochreopalpella is a moth in the  family Blastobasidae. It is found on Madeira.

References

External links

Moths described in 1858
Blastobasis